Tunisia (TUN) competed at the 1997 Mediterranean Games in Bari, Italy.

Nations at the 1997 Mediterranean Games
1997
Mediterranean Games